Menggatal or Manggatal is a Malaysian town and suburb of Kota Kinabalu District on the west coast of Sabah. It is an outskirt of the state capital, Kota Kinabalu, and is under the jurisdiction of Kota Kinabalu City Hall. It is located along Jalan Tuaran, which is the main road leading north from Kota Kinabalu city centre.  

The town is notable for being one of few towns in Sabah where wooden pre-World War II era shophouses still stand. The sub-district area's land prices are constantly rising up as most of the land area in the coastal Kota Kinabalu have already been occupied. Many developers have key interests in this sub-district area as the population of the capital district is steadily increasing.

Etymology 
The name "Manggatal" is derived from the English language during the British North Borneo Company era. Those two words of the English language are "mango" (mango) and “town” (town) in which the latter had since evolved into just “tal” due to the fast spoken linguistic nature of the native Dusuns residing in the sub-Jesselton area. This area of present-day Kota Kinabalu was referred to as “Mango Town” by the British colonials due to the infamous abundance of mangoes grown by the native Dusuns and Chinese Hakkas community. Since then, interactions between the native Dusuns and Chinese Hakkas have turned the name of town into just 'Manggatal'.

History 
During the World War II, Manggatal is also the base where the Kinabalu Guerillas led by Albert Kwok actively operating to fight the Japanese.
During the late 1990s, many native Dusuns were made instant millionaires when their Native Title (NT) lands were claimed by the government to be made into highways; the Tuaran Bypass Highway and the old route of Jalan Tuaran Highway that links Manggatal and Inanam. In present day, many landowners in Manggatal, which are also mainly native Dusuns, have also been forced to relocate from their ancestral lands due to the government's pet project, Pan Borneo Highway. They are reimbursed in the form of cash funded by the Federal Government.

Demography 
Manggatal was originally populated sparsely by native Dusuns of the Bundu ethnic. In the late 19th and early 20th centuries, this native population was supplemented by Chinese migrants, most of whom were Hakkas. The Chinese community of Manggatal, which is still dominated by Hakkas, plays an important role in the town's economy as its members own most of the shops in the town. 

Starting in the 1970s, Manggatal has witnessed a drastic increase in the population of Filipino and Indonesian immigrants, many of whom have been naturalised (both legally and illegally) and live in squatter colonies.

Education 
The state's main institution of learning, Universiti Malaysia Sabah, is located in a coastal part of Manggatal sub-district. Among other educational institutions are Institut Sinaran, Form Six College Kota Kinabalu, SMK Tebobon, SMK Bandaraya (once an elite school formerly known as SMK Manggatal) and also SJK(C) Good Shepherd.

References 

Towns in Sabah